Russell Road may refer to:

Russell Road (Ontario), Canada
Russell Road (Las Vegas), Nevada, U.S.A.
Russell Road (Ipswich), England, U.K.
A north–south road in Fort Fairfield, Maine, U.S.A. near the Canada–United States border

See also